Alejandra Ramos may refer to:

Alejandra Ramos (runner)
Alejandra Ramos (footballer)